Tree on a Hill is an album recorded by Peter Rowan & The Rowan Brothers in 1994.

Track listing
 "Tree on a Hill" (Rowan)
 "Man of Constant Sorrow" (Traditional)
 "Little Darlin' Pal of Mine" (Carter)
 "No Lonesome Tune" (VanZandt)
 "Rye Whiskey"
 "Fair and Tender Ladies"
 "Faith, Love and Devotion" (Rowan)
 "Long Time" (Rowan, Rowan)
 "Lone Pilgrim" (Traditional)
 "I'll Be There" (Rowan, Rowan, VanZandt)
 "Mary Magdalene" (Rowan)

Personnel
Peter Rowan - guitar, banjo, vocals
Lorin Rowan - mandolin, guitar, vocals
Chris Rowan - guitar, vocals
Viktor Krauss - bass
Richard Greene - fiddle
Sally Van Meter - dobro, guitar
Cindy Cashdollar - dobro, guitar
Kester Smith - percussion

References

1994 albums
The Rowans albums